Abdourahamane Diawara (born September 30, 1978) is a Guinean former swimmer, who specialized in sprint freestyle events. Diawara qualified for the men's 50 m freestyle, as Guinea's only swimmer, at the 2004 Summer Olympics in Athens, without having an entry time. He challenged five other swimmers in heat one, including 16-year-old Emile Rony Bakale of Congo. He posted a lifetime best of 28.10 to save a fifth spot over Mali's David Keita by more than a second. Diawara failed to advance into the semifinals, as he placed seventy-sixth overall out of 86 swimmers in the preliminaries.

References

1978 births
Living people
Guinean male freestyle swimmers
Olympic swimmers of Guinea
Swimmers at the 2004 Summer Olympics
People from Fria